The Interamerican Open University (in Spanish, Universidad Abierta Interamericana, UAI) is a private university in Argentina. Its main seat and rectorate is located in Buenos Aires. It has educational facilities in six locations in the city and in Buenos Aires Province, as well as three locations and an administrative seat in Rosario, Santa Fe.

The university was founded in 1995. It is part of a network called Vanguardia Educativa, made up of non-confessional teaching and research institutions. It has the following faculties:
 Architecture
 Sciences of Communication
 Entrepreneurial Sciences
 Law and Political Sciences
 Educational Development and Research
 Medicine and Health Sciences
 Human Motricity and Sports
 Psychology and Human Relations
 Informatics Technology
 Tourism and Hospitality

UAI provides also postgraduate education, granting master's degrees in several fields.

References
 Universidad Abierta Interamericana — Institutional website.
 Foro UAI — UAI students forum.

Education in Buenos Aires
Education in Rosario, Santa Fe
Private universities in Argentina
Universities in Buenos Aires Province